Flemingston (also Lanmihangel y Twyn, or Treffelemin, or Michaelston Le Mont, or Flimstone) is a small village in the Vale of Glamorgan in south Wales. It contains the Church of St. Michael the Archangel, the ruins of  Flemingston Court, and Flemingston Manor or Grange, all of which are listed buildings. Historically, the parish of Flemingston was a sub-manor of Aberthaw or St Athan.

Etymology
Flemingston village derives its name from the family of Fleming, who possessed St. George's castle and lordship. Its ancient name in Welsh is Llanmihangel y Twyn, or as it was afterwards called, Michaelston Le Mont.

History
The Fleming family descended from Sir John le Fleming. Robert Fitzhamon is said to have bestowed upon him the manors of St. George, Wenvoe, Flemingston, and Llanmaes. Fleming was married to Amicia, daughter of Baldwin Magnus, Lord of Whitney. Fleming gave the manors of Flemingston and Constantine Walles to a younger son. In 1317, Flemingston was held by Philip le Fleming. It continued in his descendants until, on failure of issue male, William Fleming sold the estate to Lewis Thomas of Bettws; while an alternate account states that the le Fleming line ended in an heiress, who married a Thomas, of Llanfihangel, through whom a sale of the property was made to the Wyndhams of Dunraven.

In 1801, the population amounted to 66 residents. A Topographical Dictionary of The Dominion of Wales (1811) by Nicholas Carlisle described Flemingston as belonging to what is now called the Hundred of Cowbridge, within the County of Glamorgan. Thomas Wyndham was the patron of the rectory, and the village church was dedicated to St. Michael. The John Marius Wilson's Imperial Gazetteer of England and Wales (1870–72) states that the Flemingston parish was within the Bridgend district or Glamorgan. The population included approximately 63 residents, and there were ten houses. Flemingston was described as being one estate, the manor belonging to Sir John Fleming, one of the twelve knights who came in with Fitzhamon in the time of William Rufus. The rectory, part of the diocese of Llandaff had a patron, the Earl of Dunraven.

Politics and Administration
Flemingston exists within the Flemingston % Eglwys Brewis community electoral ward, being allocated three councillor seats to sit on the St Athan Community Council.

2017 Flemingston Community Ward Election

Geography
Flemingston is connected to the villages of St Mary Church, Vale of Glamorgan and St Hilary, Vale of Glamorgan to the north; and Tre-Aubrey and Llantrithyd to the northeast. The River Thaw flows to the east across Flemingston Moor; excavations on the moor have unearthed some pottery dated to the 12th-13th centuries. The Nant y Stepsau also flows to the southwest. In the 19th century, Flemingston parish was approximately 600 or 672 acres in size.

Notable landmarks
The following landmarks are listed historic buildings: Church of St. Michael the Archangel (grade II*), Flemingston Court Farmhouse (II*), Detached Kitchen at Flemingston Court (II), Garden Wall and House Ruins at Flemingston Manor (II), Combination farm buildings at Flemingston Court Farm (II), Telephone Call-Box north of parish church (II) and Gregory Farm / Yr Hen Fferm Dy (II).

Church 

This stone church with a slate roof was built upon 11th century foundations. Although most of the church dates to the 19th century, some remains of the 14th-century church remain. It became a Grade II* listed building on 18 June 2002. The church contains a monumental stone slab bearing a full-length effigy of a lady, probably dating from the 14th century. The name "Elizabeth" can be made out, and she may be a member of the Fleming family. 
Some castle remains adjoin the churchyard.

Dwellings 

Flemingston Court dates to the first half of the 16th century and possibly functioned as a rectory or steward or farm manager's house. Flemingston Court Farmhouse dates to the 16th century and is a two-storey rubble and slate roof building. It contains eaves, gables, stone end stacks, a font stack, and an exposed chimney breast. Additional features are its windows, casements, moulded stone mullions, and drip-moulds. It became a Grade II* listed building on 18 June 2002. Its barn dates to the mid 19th century. The detached kitchen building, which became a Grade II listed building on 18 June 2003, dates to the early 16th century and may have been part of a later 17th-century renovation.

Yr Hen Fferm Dy, also known as Gregory Farm, has a white painted rubble farmhouse dated to the 17th century but refashioned in the 18th and 19th centuries. It became a Grade II listed building on 18 June 2007. The rectory is located in the northern part of the village in a wooded garden and dates to the 19th century. Rose Cottage is dated to the 16th or 17th century, built from rubble stone, with a thatched roof and "eyebrow windows".

Notable people
The poet, Iolo Morganwg (Edward Williams; 1747–1826), was from Flemingston. Homeschooled by his mother, he learned to read by watching his father carve words on tombstones.

References

Villages in the Vale of Glamorgan
St Athan